Chima Venida Uzoka (born 12 June 1998) is a Filipino footballer who plays as a forward for Philippines Football League club Cebu.

Collegiate career
Uzoka attended National University for his collegiate studies.

Club career

Green Archers United
While playing in the UAAP, Uzoka as well was playing for Green Archers United in the United Football League (UFL).

Ilocos United
In 2017, Uzoka joined newly-founded Philippines Football League club Ilocos United. They played in the inaugural season in 2017 before it was dissolved in January 2018.

Global Cebu
Uzoka then joined Global Cebu.

Chainat Hornbill
In 2018, Uzoka signed for Thai side Chainat Hornbill.

Stallion Laguna
Uzoka returned to the Philippines and joined Stallion Laguna.

Return to Global Makati
After a short stint with Stallion Laguna, Uzoka returned to his former club Global Makati.

Azkals Development Team
Before the 2020 Philippines Football League, he signed for Azkals Development Team in the Philippines, playing in three games for ADT in the COVID-19 pandemic-shortened 2020 season and scoring a brace against Mendiola FC 1991 in a 5–0 victory.

Dynamic Herb Cebu
In March 31, 2022, Dynamic Herb Cebu announced the signing of Uzoka for the 2022 Philippines Football League season.

International career
Born in Zamboanga City, Philippines to a Nigerian father and a Filipino mother, Uzoka is eligible to represent either Philippines or Nigeria at international level.

Philippines U19
In 2015, Uzoka was called up to the Philippines U19 team for the 2015 AFF U-19 Youth Championship held at Laos National Stadium, Vientiane, Laos. He made his debut for Philippines U19 in a 4−1 defeat against Thailand U19.

Philippines U23
Uzoka was part of the Philippines U22 squad that competed in the 2019 Southeast Asian Games held in the Philippines. He made his debut for the U22 team in a 1–1 draw against Cambodia U22.

References

External links
 

Filipino people of Nigerian descent
Filipino footballers
Filipino expatriate sportspeople in Thailand
Filipino expatriate footballers
Living people
Chima Uzoka
Expatriate footballers in Thailand
Chima Uzoka
Philippines Football League players
Global Makati F.C. players
Association football forwards
Ilocos United F.C. players
1998 births
Azkals Development Team players
Cebu F.C. players